David A. Ansell (born 1952) is a Chicago-based physician, social epidemiologist and author. His efforts at both the national and local levels have advanced concerns about health inequities and the structure of the US health care system. His years as a provider to the medically underserved have made him a vocal supporter of single-payer health care.
He spent seventeen years at Cook County Hospital currently known as John H. Stroger Hospital of Cook County upon which the medical T.V. drama ER was based. Ansell was inspired by his time at Cook County Hospital to write a memoir and social history entitled, County: Life, Death, and Politics in Chicago’s Public Hospital. County was hailed as a "landmark book" by Julia Keller of the Chicago Tribune, aiming "to inform and to inspire" readers about the disparities in health care. In the book, Ansell argues that only a single-payer solution that provides access to all US residents regardless of circumstances can provide relief for those closed out of the health care system.

Early years and education 
Ansell spent his formative years in Binghamton, New York. After high school, he attended Franklin and Marshall College (B.A., 1974) and medical school at the SUNY Upstate Medical University (M.D., 1978) He received his Masters of Public Health from the University of Illinois School of Public Health (1991)

Medical education and training 
After finishing medical school in 1978, Ansell trained at Chicago’s Cook County Hospital, one of the nation's oldest and foremost public hospitals. After residency, Ansell served at County as attending physician for 13 years, joining other physicians in a new Division of General Medicine/Primary Care.

Efforts against patient dumping 
In the mid 1980s, Ansell and colleagues noted a marked increase in the numbers of patients transferred to public hospitals around Chicago and the US, due to a lack of health insurance. This practice is known as patient dumping. In 1984, Ansell joined a project led by Robert Schiff], M.D., to expose patient dumping in Chicago.  He contributed to the article "Transfers to a Public Hospital" that appeared in the February 1986 edition of the New England Journal of Medicine, criticizing patient dumping and the unnecessary deaths it caused. Efforts against patient dumping like this eventually led to the Emergency Medical Treatment and Labor Act that made the emergency transfers of patients illegal.

Health Inequity Work 
Ansell founded and directed one of first programs in the US to battle race-based disparity in health care, the Breast and Cervical Cancer Screening Program at Cook County Hospital, in 1984. In 1995, Ansell left Cook County Hospital to become Chairman of the Department of Internal Medicine of Mount Sinai Hospital in Chicago, the city's largest private safety-net hospital. Among other activities at Mount Sinai, in 2002 he founded the Sinai Urban Health Institute a major health-disparity research and intervention center along with the late Steven Whitman, PhD who served as its director.
In 2006, he and Dr. Whitman helped expose the racial breast cancer mortality gap in Chicago in an article they published. In response, they joined with others to found the Metropolitan Chicago Breast Cancer Taskforce, a group dedicated to the elimination of this disparity in the Chicago area.

In 2015, Ansell helped found the DePaul-Rush Center for Community Health Equity a Chicago-based health equity educational and research center based at DePaul University and Rush University Medical Center.

Leadership Positions 
Division Chief, Division of General Medicine/Primary Care, Cook County Hospital, Chicago, IL, 1993-1995
Chairperson, Department of Internal Medicine, Mount Sinai Hospital, Chicago, IL, 1995-2005
Chief Medical Officer at Rush University Medical Center, Chicago, IL, 2005–2015
Senior Vice President for System Integration/Community Health at Rush University Medical Center. Chicago, IL, 2015 to present.

Published books 
Ansell first book was entitled, County: Life, Death, and Politics at Chicago’s Public Hospital. In the book, Ansell tells the story of his patients and colleagues during his seventeen years as a resident and attending physician at Chicago’s Cook County Hospital, one of America’s premier public hospitals.  County was released on July 1, 2011 and received positive reviews, The Wall Street Journal named it " one of the five best health books of 2011.

His second book is entitled The Death Gap: How Inequality Kills, and was published by the University of Chicago Press in 2017

References 

American primary care physicians
American healthcare managers
Writers from Chicago
1952 births
Living people
Writers from Binghamton, New York
Activists from New York (state)